Proud Mary: The Best of Ike & Tina Turner is a compilation album released as part of EMI's Legends Of Rock N' Roll Series in 1991. In 2003, Rolling Stone magazine ranked the album number 212 on their list of the 500 greatest albums of all time (number 214 on 2012 revised list, and number 392 in the 2020 edition).

Content 
Proud Mary: The Best of Ike & Tina Turner features some of Ike & Tina's greatest hits from their formation in 1960 until their separation in 1976. The tracks were previously released on Sue Records, Minit Records, Liberty Records, and United Artists Records. Due to license issues, the version of "River Deep, Mountain High" on the album is not the original wall of sound production by Phil Spector, it's the re-recording produced by Ike Turner from the album Nutbush City Limits. Included are two additional and hidden tracks, which are radio promotions for the album Come Together.

Critical reception 
Reviewing Proud Mary: The Best of Ike & Tina Turner for Entertainment Weekly, Ira Robbins wrote:Long before she became a household name in the '80s, Tina Turner earned her place in the Rock and Roll Hall of Fame as an incendiary rhythm & blues belter, the riveting centerpiece of her husband Ike's kinetic soul revue. This limited compilation of the Turners' career begins with their first seven singles together — gutsy Southern soul stirrers recorded between 1960 and 1962 — then leaps to 1970, when the duo cannily began targeting the rock audience with idiosyncratic interpretations of the Beatles' "Come Together" and Creedence Clearwater’s "Proud Mary." Al Quaglieri's exemplary liner notes provide fascinating background and insight, but Proud Mary: The Best of Ike and Tina Turner still isn't a first-rate retrospective. If nothing else, the inclusion of a modest remake of "River Deep, Mountain High" instead of the monumental version produced by Phil Spector, makes Proud Mary a compromise rather than a victory.

Personnel
 Ike Turner – vocals, guitar, bass
 Tina Turner – vocals
 The Ikettes – backing vocalists
 Ike Turner (tracks: 1 to 15, 17 to 22), Juggy Murray (tracks: 1 to 3, 5 to 7), Claude Williams (tracks: 19 to 21), Gerhard Augustin (tracks: 16, 20, 21), Denny Diante (tracks 22 & 23), Spencer Proffer (tracks 22 & 23) – original producers
Ron Furmanek – compilation producer

Track listing

References

Ike & Tina Turner compilation albums
1991 compilation albums
EMI Records compilation albums